The Feme ('fā-mə) murders were a series of politically motivated murders in Weimar Germany from 1919 to 1923 that were committed by elements of the German far right against political opponents they considered treasonous. The practice was exposed in 1925 but few of the perpetrators were identified or prosecuted.

Definition 

Feme (from Middle Low German veime, meaning punishment), in the usage of right-wing extremist underground movements, referred to an act of vigilante justice – the killing of "traitors" who, as members of their own groups or as outsiders, knew about weapons caches or other internal secrets and had reported them to the authorities or threatened to do so. One of the groups most involved in the murders, the Organisation Consul, an ultra-nationalist, anti-Semitic and anti-communist secret society founded in 1920, stated in their statutes that "Traitors fall to the Feme".

The term is sometimes also used to refer to the political assassination of democratic politicians such as former Reich Minister of Finance Matthias Erzberger (1921), Karl Gareis of the Bavarian parliament (1921) and Foreign Minister Walther Rathenau (1922), as well as the failed assassination of Philipp Scheidemann (1922) by members of the Organisation Consul. According to political scientist Hans-Helmuth Knütter, these assassinations, as well as political assassinations from the left, should be distinguished from Feme murders. A Reichstag committee in 1926 similarly distinguished Feme murders from other political murders by limiting the use of the term to murders perpetrated by members of a group against those who betrayed secrets. This included similar acts by far left groups.

Number of victims 
Nearly all of the Feme murders occurred during the turbulent early years of the Weimar Republic. A peak was reached in 1923 when hyperinflation, Allied occupation of the Ruhr, Adolf Hitler's Beer Hall Putsch, and separatist efforts shook Germany. By 1924 a total of nearly 400 of their political opponents had fallen victim to right-wing radical and National Socialist assassinations by the Organisation Consul, the Viking League, the Black Reichswehr, the Sturmabteilung Roßbach, the Bavarian Citizens' Defense and their successor organizations. Within the Black Reichswehr, First Lieutenant Paul Schulz commanded a special unit that killed those who were seen guilty of betraying the country by leaking military secrets.

Reactions 
The first to attempt to study the phenomenon systematically and for all of Germany was the statistician Emil Julius Gumbel, who in 1922 presented the paper Four Years of Political Murder (later updated under the title From Feme Murder to the Reich Chancellery). Gumbel was subjected to serious threats because of the study.

While the Weimar judiciary rigorously prosecuted leftists involved in the German Revolution of 1918–1919 and in the political activities of the Bavarian Soviet Republic, police and judicial investigations of the Feme crimes were slow, and the murderers, insofar as they were identified, got off with light sentences or even acquittals. Mid-level military officers such as Paul Schulz of the Black Reichswehr were eventually convicted and imprisoned before an amnesty for the Feme murders was declared in 1930, but Germans who exposed the killings were tried and convicted for insulting the military establishment for their role in doing so, even when their allegations against the military were true.

The obvious deficiencies in law enforcement were matters of concern for several parliaments during the Weimar period. In 1920 the state parliament of Bavaria set up its own investigative committee to look into the Feme murder of Reichswehr soldier Hans Dobner. In 1924 the state parliament in Prussia set up a "Political Murders" investigative committee, and two years later instituted a second. In November 1925 the journal Die Weltbühne published an unattributed article by Carl Mertens, a German officer and pacifist, about the Feme murders of more than twenty members of right-wing groups. In January 1926, at the request of the Social Democratic Party (SPD), an investigative committee of the Reichstag, under the name "Feme Organizations and Feme Murders", was set up to clarify the crimes and their political environment in parties, the Reichswehr and the judiciary. The project was hindered from the beginning by the right-wing majority in the parliament, the Bavarian judicial authorities' refusal to cooperate, and not least by the indecisiveness of the SPD itself.

Selected list of victims 

 July 1920: Willi Schmidt, member of the Freikorps Rossbach; shot by Edmund Heines and other members of the Rossbach group in a forest in the Greifenhagen district of Pomerania after being suspected of trying to betray a weapons cache to the authorities.
 6 October 1920: Maria Sandmayer (b. 1901), maid, found strangled in Forstenrieder Park, Munich; murdered after she tried to report a weapons cache of the Bavarian Citizens' Defense.
 4 March 1921: Hans Hartung (b. 1897), waiter, shot and his body recovered from the Zusam River near Zusmarshausen; murdered after he tried to get paid for his silence about the activities of the Bavarian Citizens' Defense.
 5 June 1921: Josef Nowak, St. Annaberg in Silesia, arrested on 4 June 1921 on suspicion of espionage in favor of the Polish side in the Silesian Uprising. He was driven through his village by eight members of the Upper Silesian Self-Defense Force, beaten with sidearms and rifle butts, and then, along with three others who were also accused of treason, driven to the basalt quarry near St. Annaberg and beaten and shot to death. The bodies were buried under stone rubble and found a few days later by their relatives. Nowak had merely said that he thought that the fighting between Germans and Poles in Upper Silesia was a senseless civil war.

 1921: Alfons Hentschel: Lieutenant, platoon leader in the company of Captain von Mauritz, behind whom in reality the Freikorps leader Franz Pfeffer von Salomon was hiding. As an inconvenient accessory, Hentschel was shot in the back during a patrol in a cornfield on the orders of Mauritz (i.e., Pfeffer).
 1921: Sigulla, a man from Opole in Upper Silesia. For unexplained reasons a rumor arose that he was a deserter from the Freikorps Roßbach and a Polish informer. A Bavarian Freikorps lieutenant named "Seppl" arrested Sigulla and led him into a nearby forest where he cut his throat. "Seppl" was arrested but released from custody after the withdrawal of the Entente troops from Upper Silesia.
 February 1923: Karl Baur (1901–1923), student, shot dead in Munich by members of the radical right-wing Blücher League to prevent him from betraying plans for a coup by the League.
 4 June 1923: Erich Pannier, a member of the Black Reichswehr in Döberitz in Brandenburg, was killed by Black Reichswehr members after he "deserted" from the Black Reichswehr.
 July 1923: Walter Wilms, sergeant, deliberately made drunk by officers after he was suspected of spying for the Communists and then shot in a car outside Rathenow in Brandenburg and thrown into the Havel River.

References

1910s murders in Germany
1920s murders in Germany
Political repression in Germany
Terrorism in Germany
Politics of the Weimar Republic
Terrorist incidents in the 1910s
Terrorist incidents in the 1920s
1919 murders in Germany 
1920 murders in Germany
1921 murders in Germany
1922 murders in Germany
1923 murders in Germany